Shir Hesar may refer to:
 Shir Hesar, Kenevist
 Shir Hesar, Miyan Velayat